Pneuma is the debut full-length album released by the New York band Moving Mountains. It was originally self-released in 2007 but was eventually reissued with Deep Elm Records.

The album was the creative product of multi-instrumentalist Gregory Dunn and drummer Nicholas Pizzolato, and was produced, mixed, and mastered by Dunn during their late high school years. At the time of its release, Moving Mountains was only considered to be a studio project by Dunn and Pizzolato, with no future intentions of forming a full band or playing the songs in a live format. It was not until a few months later, when Pneuma started to gain positive acclaim throughout the internet, that the band decided to go in a full-band direction with the addition of bassist Mitchell Lee and guitarist/vocalist Frank Graniero.

Track listing

Pneuma tracks “Aphelion,” “Fourth,” and “8105” have been used on MTV’s College Life, 16 and Pregnant, and Teen Mom.

“Aphelion” has been used for a trailer for AMC’s television drama series Mad Men.

Personnel
 Gregory Dunn - Vocals, Guitar, Bass, Trombone, Keyboards
 Nicholas Pizzolato - Drums
 Michelle Cagianese - Cello, Vocals
 Peter Fusco - Vibraphone, Glockenspiel

References

2007 debut albums
Moving Mountains (band) albums
Deep Elm Records albums
Self-released albums